The Perlbach is a river in Bavaria in the provinces of Lower Bavaria and Upper Palatinate, which drains into the Regen west of Wiesing in the borough of Roding in the Upper Palatine county of Cham.

Name 
On the Lower Bavarian side and up to Falkenstein the Perlbach is still called by its original name of Miethnach.
That the name Miethnach is the older, is indicated by the name of the hamlet Mietnach am Perlbach (between Marienstein and Trasching), west of the Zinzenberg.

Course 
The Perlbach rises in the Lower Bavarian county of Straubing-Bogen south of Zinzenzell between Geraszell and the Edenhof. It flows, roughly speaking, northwestwards; its upper course more or less constantly, while its lower course runs in a large, roughly semi-circular arc towards the southwest and back. Early on it enters the Upper Palatine county of Cham, in which it remains until it reaches its mouth near Wiesing and empties into the Regen.

Its larger tributaries are the left-hand Geißbach which joins it near Völling, the left-hand Urbachl near Au and the longest, last and right-hand Neudecker Bach just after Trasching.

References

External links 
 Verlauf des Perlbachs auf dem BayernAtlas

Rivers of Bavaria
Straubing-Bogen
Cham (district)
Rivers of Germany